René Antonio Meléndez Plaza (born 19 November 1998) is a Chilean footballer who plays for Lautaro de Buin.

International career
Meléndez represented Chile at under-17 level in both the 2015 South American Championship in Paraguay and the 2015 FIFA World Cup in Chile.

References

External links
 
 René Meléndez at Soccerzz

1998 births
Living people
People from San Antonio, Chile
Chilean footballers
Chile youth international footballers
Chilean Primera División players
Primera B de Chile players
Segunda División Profesional de Chile players
Audax Italiano footballers
Deportes Melipilla footballers
Lautaro de Buin footballers
Association football defenders